Gulf and Fraser Fishermen's Credit Union, operating as Gulf & Fraser is a member-owned financial institution in Burnaby, British Columbia, Canada, and the sixth largest credit union in British Columbia by asset size. With a history dating back to 1940, Gulf & Fraser provides banking and a variety of financial services including borrowing, investments and financial planning. It is insured by the Credit Union Deposit Insurance Corporation of British Columbia, a crown corporation that insures the deposits of credit union members.

History
Gulf & Fraser's history extends back to 1940, when a group of BC fishermen incorporated the North Arm Fisherman's Credit Union. Since that time, the credit union has gone through over 30 mergers and many name changes. One of the most significant mergers occurred in 2004 when United Savings Credit Union merged with Gulf and Fraser Fishermen's Credit Union. Another notable merger was with Pioneer Credit Union — the third credit union to be chartered in British Columbia. Pioneer Credit Union was granted charter number 003, which G&F retained for the merged entity.

In August 2021, G&F Financial Group merged with Aldergrove Credit Union and on January 1, 2022, G&F Financial Group merged with V.P. Credit Union and Mount Lehman Credit Union. The combined organization has 26 branches located in the Lower Mainland and Fraser Valley and a membership of over 61,000.

Gulf & Fraser's administration office is located at Suite 401 - 7300 Edmonds Street, Burnaby, British Columbia, V3N 0G8, Canada.

Predecessors

The following is a partial list of credit unions that form part of Gulf & Fraser's history either through name changes, mergers or acquisitions:

North Arm Fisherman's Credit Union
Lower Fraser Fishermen's Credit Union
Common Good Co-Operative Association
Pioneer Credit Union
C.E.F.U. #28 Credit Union
Civic Employees Credit Union
United Services Credit Union
Mount Pleasant Credit Union
Burnaby Savings Credit Union
Allied Savings Credit Union
Finning Employees Credit Union 
United Savings Credit Union
Burlington Northern Credit Union
Sheet Metal Workers Credit Union
Elco Credit Union (BC Hydro Employees)
Aldergrove Credit Union
V.P. Credit Union
Mount Lehman Credit Union

Community Involvement

As a member-owned credit union, Gulf & Fraser has a long history of supporting the communities that they serve. In addition to financial donations, Gulf & Fraser encourages staff involvement within the communities that they operate.

On February 25, 2021, G&F Financial Group announced their exclusive sponsorship of the Personal Finance program for high school students, run by Junior Achievement British Columbia. The credit union also donated $20,000 into the program.

In 2020, G&F Financial Group, the Board of Directors, employees, partners and sponsors gave $575,000 to local community groups, scholarship and bursary programs, charities, and cultural and sports organizations. This included three major charitable fundraisers where employees, partners and sponsors raised $170,000.

On December 30, 2020, G&F Financial Group announced a donation of $80,000 to local charities and groups impacted by the COVID-19 pandemic. Of that, $60,000 went to local food banks, shelters, and hospitals, which were among some of the hardest hit by the  COVID-19 pandemic.

On September 28, 2020, G&F Financial Group announced a donation of $132,000 to The Centre for Child Development in Surrey, BC. This was the second year of their three-year fundraising commitment for the Centre, which helps children with special needs reach their potential. The Centre provides physiotherapy, family services, childcare, communication and occupational therapy, and recreation services to thousands of children in Metro Vancouver.

On January 7, 2020, G&F Financial Group announced they had reached a milestone of $1 million in donations to the United Way of the Lower Mainland since they started fundraising in 2001.

On September 9, 2019, G&F Financial Group donated $124,680 to The Centre for Child Development. The Centre helps children with special needs reach their potential; it provides physiotherapy, family services, childcare, communication and occupational therapy, and recreation services to thousands of children in Metro Vancouver. Funds were raised through G&F's annual golf tournament and matched by an anonymous foundation.

On June 2, 2019, G&F Financial Group presented a cheque for $26,000 to BC Children's Hospital Foundation during their Miracle Weekend event. G&F employees raised funds for the Foundation through a variety of events, including 50/50 draws, Jeans Day, music trivia, sports jersey draws, Bingo games, and by selling Purdy’s chocolates. “Superhero” employees in each corporate department and branch put extra effort into encouraging their co-workers to participate in the fundraising activities.

On January 8, 2019, G&F Financial Group announced they had donated $54,000 to the United Way of the Lower Mainland. Funds will go towards the welfare of children and breaking the cycle of poverty. Over the lifetime of G&F's campaign, the credit union has donated close to $880,000 to the United Way of the Lower Mainland.

In 2018, G&F Financial Group, the Board of Directors, employees, partners and sponsors gave $532,000 to the communities that they serve, distributed in the form of donations, sponsorships, educational bursaries, scholarships and through the G&F Financial Group Foundation. 

On September 20, 2018, G&F Financial Group announced they had donated $100,000 to the Richmond Hospital Foundation. The funds will support the foundation's ACT NOW campaign to build a much-needed acute care tower. The funds were raised through two events held by the credit union: a special retirement dinner and their annual charity golf tournament.

On November 2, 2011, the South Burnaby Branch of G&F Financial Group was the winner of the Burnaby Board of Trade's Business Excellence Community Spirit Award. The award recognizes local organizations for demonstrating outstanding corporate social responsibility and for the strong support of local non-profit organizations and agencies.

References

External links
Official website
"Financial institutions reluctant to bankroll cannabis", Vancouver Courier, September 28, 2019
"A lift for health: G&F Financial Group Foundation helps stroke patients", Langley Memorial Hospital Foundation, December 9, 2018
"Fishers collectively cast financial nets for 77 years", Richmond Sentinel, February 16, 2018
"Movers & Shakers: G&F supports Justice Institute of B.C.", Burnaby Now, December 8, 2016
"Trusting your first instinct is the key to success", BC Business, July 30, 2014
"G&F gets nod from trade board", Burnaby Now, October 12, 2012
Vote Caps Local Credit Union Merger, Columbia Journal, March 2004

Credit unions of British Columbia
Companies based in Burnaby